Kunwara Baap (Bachelor Father) is a 1942 Hindi comedy film directed by Kishore Sahu. The film was the debut directorial venture for Sahu, who directed it for the debutant producer N. R. Acharya. Acharya had just started his production company Acharya Arts Productions. The story was written by Kishore Sahu who went on to write and direct films like Kali Ghata, Mayurpankh and others. The music direction was by Ramchandra Pal. The film had Kishore Sahu starring as the bachelor father with co-stars Protima Dasgupta, Anjali Devi, Nana Palsikar, Amritlal Nagar and Moni Chatterjee.

It was one of the winners for the BFJA - Best Indian Films Award for best film for 1943.

Prannath finds an infant abandoned in his car on his engagement day. The finding leads to several comedic situations in the film. The film was inspired by Bachelor Mother (1939), directed by Garson Kanin and starring Ginger Rogers. The story was reversed in Kunwara Baap, with the hero getting landed with the child.

Plot
Prannath (Kishore Sahu) goes to the jeweller's to buy a ring for his to-be fiancée. While he is in the store, an unwed mother leaves her infant in the back of Prannath's car. When he comes out he realises he's stuck with the baby much to his discomfiture as his betrothed refuses to believe his story. The situation gives rise to several funny sequences till the villainous father of the child admits to being the real father and agrees to marry the mother of the abandoned child.

Cast
 Kishore Sahu
 Protima Dasgupta
 Baby Lal
 Anjali Devi
 Dhulia
 Manohar Ghatwani
 Moni Chatterjee
 Jamu Patel
 Hadi
 Amritlal Nagar
 Nana Palsikar

Reception
The film became a big success commercially, and was a hit at the box office as well as with the critics. Citing it as a "sparkling comedy", Narwekar quotes that the film was hailed as a "sophisticated stream-lined comedy".

Remakes
 Vazhkai (1949) a Tamil film, directed by  A.V. Meiyappan and starring Vyjantimala in her debut role, drew inspiration from the Kunwara Baap's storyline.
 Bahar (1951) directed by M. V. Raman was the Hindi remake of Vazhkai.
 Kunwara Baap (1974) directed by Mehmood.

Soundtrack
The music composer was Ramchandra Pal. Amritlal Nagar, a well-known Hindi writer wrote the lyrics for the film. The other lyricists were Baalam Pardesi and Satyakam Sharma.

Song List

References

External links

1942 films
1940s Hindi-language films
Films directed by Kishore Sahu
Indian remakes of American films
Indian comedy films
1942 comedy films
Indian black-and-white films